Sefid Khani Ahmedvand (also Romanized as Sefīd Khānī Āḥmedvand; also known as Krūbaneh) is a village in Itivand-e Jonubi Rural District, Kakavand District, Delfan County, Lorestan Province, Iran. At the 2006 census, its population was 90, in 18 families.

References 

Towns and villages in Delfan County